Carrasco Bonito is a municipality in the Brazilian state of Tocantins. Carrasco Bonito's population was at 4,130 in 2020 and it has an area of 193 km².

The municipality contains 94% of the  Extremo Norte do Tocantins Extractive Reserve, created in 1992.

References

Municipalities in Tocantins